Moscow City Duma District 4 is one of 45 constituencies in Moscow City Duma. The constituency has covered parts of North-Western and Western Moscow since 2014. From 1993-2005 District 4 also was based in Northern Moscow; from 2005-2014 the constituency was based in North-Eastern Moscow (it actually overlapped the entirety of State Duma Medvedkovo constituency in 2005-2014).

Members elected

Election results

2001

|-
! colspan=2 style="background-color:#E9E9E9;text-align:left;vertical-align:top;" |Candidate
! style="background-color:#E9E9E9;text-align:left;vertical-align:top;" |Party
! style="background-color:#E9E9E9;text-align:right;" |Votes
! style="background-color:#E9E9E9;text-align:right;" |%
|-
|style="background-color:"|
|align=left|Igor Antonov (incumbent)
|align=left|Independent
|
|58.95%
|-
|style="background-color:#1042A5"|
|align=left|Yelena Guseva
|align=left|Union of Right Forces
|
|11.85%
|-
|style="background-color:"|
|align=left|Mark Antonov
|align=left|Independent
|
|6.76%
|-
|style="background-color:#3A46CE"|
|align=left|Vladimir Shmelev
|align=left|We — First Free Generation
|
|5.00%
|-
|style="background-color:"|
|align=left|Leonid Besov
|align=left|Independent
|
|2.20%
|-
|style="background-color:#000000"|
|colspan=2 |against all
|
|12.33%
|-
| colspan="5" style="background-color:#E9E9E9;"|
|- style="font-weight:bold"
| colspan="3" style="text-align:left;" | Total
| 
| 100%
|-
| colspan="5" style="background-color:#E9E9E9;"|
|- style="font-weight:bold"
| colspan="4" |Source:
|
|}

2005

|-
! colspan=2 style="background-color:#E9E9E9;text-align:left;vertical-align:top;" |Candidate
! style="background-color:#E9E9E9;text-align:left;vertical-align:top;" |Party
! style="background-color:#E9E9E9;text-align:right;" |Votes
! style="background-color:#E9E9E9;text-align:right;" |%
|-
|style="background-color:"|
|align=left|Valery Shaposhnikov (incumbent)
|align=left|United Russia
|
|51.19%
|-
|style="background-color:"|
|align=left|Nikolay Zubrilin
|align=left|Communist Party
|
|19.26%
|-
|style="background-color:"|
|align=left|Kira Lukyanova
|align=left|Rodina
|
|14.07%
|-
|style="background-color:"|
|align=left|Vladislav Tavadov
|align=left|Independent
|
|5.15%
|-
|style="background-color:"|
|align=left|Dmitry Nikonov
|align=left|Independent
|
|3.33%
|-
| colspan="5" style="background-color:#E9E9E9;"|
|- style="font-weight:bold"
| colspan="3" style="text-align:left;" | Total
| 
| 100%
|-
| colspan="5" style="background-color:#E9E9E9;"|
|- style="font-weight:bold"
| colspan="4" |Source:
|
|}

2009

|-
! colspan=2 style="background-color:#E9E9E9;text-align:left;vertical-align:top;" |Candidate
! style="background-color:#E9E9E9;text-align:left;vertical-align:top;" |Party
! style="background-color:#E9E9E9;text-align:right;" |Votes
! style="background-color:#E9E9E9;text-align:right;" |%
|-
|style="background-color:"|
|align=left|Valery Shaposhnikov (incumbent)
|align=left|United Russia
|
|66.55%
|-
|style="background-color:"|
|align=left|Vladimir Popov
|align=left|Communist Party
|
|16.14%
|-
|style="background-color:"|
|align=left|Anton Sokolov
|align=left|Liberal Democratic Party
|
|7.22%
|-
|style="background-color:"|
|align=left|Dmitry Nikonov
|align=left|Independent
|
|4.82%
|-
| colspan="5" style="background-color:#E9E9E9;"|
|- style="font-weight:bold"
| colspan="3" style="text-align:left;" | Total
| 
| 100%
|-
| colspan="5" style="background-color:#E9E9E9;"|
|- style="font-weight:bold"
| colspan="4" |Source:
|
|}

2014

|-
! colspan=2 style="background-color:#E9E9E9;text-align:left;vertical-align:top;" |Candidate
! style="background-color:#E9E9E9;text-align:left;vertical-align:top;" |Party
! style="background-color:#E9E9E9;text-align:right;" |Votes
! style="background-color:#E9E9E9;text-align:right;" |%
|-
|style="background-color:"|
|align=left|Yevgeny Gerasimov (incumbent)
|align=left|United Russia
|
|51.78%
|-
|style="background-color:"|
|align=left|Irina Kopkina
|align=left|Yabloko
|
|23.58%
|-
|style="background-color:"|
|align=left|Rustam Makhmudov
|align=left|Communist Party
|
|9.92%
|-
|style="background-color:"|
|align=left|Irina Pavlenko
|align=left|A Just Russia
|
|8.29%
|-
|style="background-color:"|
|align=left|Svyatoslav Alyrin
|align=left|Liberal Democratic Party
|
|3.45%
|-
| colspan="5" style="background-color:#E9E9E9;"|
|- style="font-weight:bold"
| colspan="3" style="text-align:left;" | Total
| 
| 100%
|-
| colspan="5" style="background-color:#E9E9E9;"|
|- style="font-weight:bold"
| colspan="4" |Source:
|
|}

2019

|-
! colspan=2 style="background-color:#E9E9E9;text-align:left;vertical-align:top;" |Candidate
! style="background-color:#E9E9E9;text-align:left;vertical-align:top;" |Party
! style="background-color:#E9E9E9;text-align:right;" |Votes
! style="background-color:#E9E9E9;text-align:right;" |%
|-
|style="background-color:"|
|align=left|Mariya Kiselyova
|align=left|Independent
|
|41.29%
|-
|style="background-color:"|
|align=left|Sergey Desyatkin
|align=left|Communist Party
|
|35.06%
|-
|style="background-color:"|
|align=left|Darya Mitina
|align=left|Communists of Russia
|
|9.99%
|-
|style="background-color:"|
|align=left|Vladimir Bessonov
|align=left|Liberal Democratic Party
|
|6.54%
|-
|style="background-color:"|
|align=left|Erik Lobakh
|align=left|A Just Russia
|
|3.74%
|-
| colspan="5" style="background-color:#E9E9E9;"|
|- style="font-weight:bold"
| colspan="3" style="text-align:left;" | Total
| 
| 100%
|-
| colspan="5" style="background-color:#E9E9E9;"|
|- style="font-weight:bold"
| colspan="4" |Source:
|
|}

Notes

References

Moscow City Duma districts